Jack Rio is a 2008 American thriller film directed by Gregori J. Martin. The film is based on a short film written and directed by the film's lead actor Matt Borlenghi.

Premise
Tommy Jamison is a famous actor, who is the star of the television soap opera The Incredible Jack Rio. He has played the lead for four years; however, he is sick of playing the role and how people never even call him by his real name, instead calling him by his character's name. The pressure from fans, the loss of his identity and the pressure to be "Jack" has become too much for him. Jamison wants to quit the show that has made him famous. When a string of murders seem to follow in his wake, the question is asked, does Tommy have an obsessed stalker, killing in his honor?

Cast
 Matthew Borlenghi as Tommy Jamison / Jack Rio
 Mary Kate Schellhardt as Jamie McNeil / Jill Madison
 Sean Kanan as Adam McNeil
 Meadow Williams as Andrea Shane
 James Patrick Stuart as Michael Applebaum
 Monti Sharp as Det. Sean Jones
 Brian Krause as Billy Rafferty
 Nadia Bjorlin as Sonia Hunter
 Jonathan LaPaglia as Devon Russel
 Adrianne Curry as Lisa

References

External links
 

2008 films
2008 thriller films
American thriller films
Features based on short films
Films about actors
2000s English-language films
2000s American films